Gurbeşti may refer to several villages in Romania:

 Gurbeşti, a village in Căbești Commune, Bihor County
 Gurbeşti, a village in Spinuș Commune, Bihor County